Pseudochromis ammeri the Raja Ampat dottyback, is a species of ray-finned fish from the Pacific Ocean around Indonesia, which is a member of the family Pseudochromidae.

References

ammeri
Taxa named by Anthony C. Gill
Taxa named by Gerald R. Allen
Taxa named by Mark van Nydeck Erdmann
Fish described in 2012